Alessia Riner (born 8 January 2004) is a Swiss female handballer for LK Zug in the Spar Premium League and the Swiss national team.

She made her official debut on the Swiss national team on 20 March 2021, against Faroe Islands. She represented Switzerland for the first time at the 2022 European Women's Handball Championship in Slovenia, Montenegro and North Macedonia.

References

External links

2004 births
Living people
Swiss female handball players
21st-century Swiss women